József Hunics (March 10, 1936 – July 27, 2012) was a Hungarian sprint canoer who competed in the late 1950s. He won a bronze medal in the C-2 10000 m event at the 1956 Summer Olympics in Melbourne. He died at the end of July 2012.

References
József Hunics' profile at Sports Reference.com
József Hunics' obituary 

1936 births
2012 deaths
Canoeists at the 1956 Summer Olympics
Hungarian male canoeists
Olympic canoeists of Hungary
Olympic bronze medalists for Hungary
Olympic medalists in canoeing
Medalists at the 1956 Summer Olympics
20th-century Hungarian people